University Hospital Summerville was founded in 1952, as a private Roman Catholic tertiary care facility known as St. Joseph Hospital located in Augusta, Georgia. The hospital is known for its comprehensive diagnostic services, including cardiac catheterization, magnetic resonance imaging, and osteoporosis treatment.

History
St. Joseph Hospital, later known as Trinity Hospital, was founded in 1952. The hospital had 110 licensed beds at the time. It quickly grew to its present-day size of about 231 licensed beds and became known for pioneering many medical firsts. Among them include cochlear hearing implants, stereotactic mammography, and a unique treatment program for hip and knee replacement.

Trinity was sold by its owner, Ascension Health, to Triad Hospitals in 2006. Triad merged with Community Health Systems in 2007. Trinity was sold to University Hospital (Augusta, Georgia) in 2017, to become University Hospital Summerville.

See also
Medical College of Georgia
University Hospital (Augusta, Georgia)
Doctors Hospital (Augusta, Georgia)

References

External links

Hospital buildings completed in 1952
Hospitals in Augusta, Georgia